MJQ & Friends: A 40th Anniversary Celebration is an album by American jazz group the Modern Jazz Quartet featuring performances recorded in New York City, Los Angeles and at the Montreux Jazz Festival with guest artists including Bobby McFerrin, Take 6, Phil Woods, Wynton Marsalis, Illinois Jacquet, Harry "Sweets" Edison, Branford Marsalis, Jimmy Heath, Freddie Hubbard and Nino Tempo and released on the Atlantic label.

Reception
The Allmusic review stated "It's an enjoyable and varied set".

Track listing
 "Bags' Groove" (Milt Jackson) – 5:01
 "All the Things You Are" (Oscar Hammerstein II, Jerome Kern) – 5:57
 "Cherokee" (Ray Noble) – 6:08
 "(Back Home Again in) Indiana" (James F. Hanley< Ballard MacDonald) – 7:44
 "Come Rain or Come Shine" (Harold Arlen, Johnny Mercer) – 5:28
 "Willow Weep for Me" (Ann Ronell) – 6:14
 "Memories of You" (Eubie Blake, Andy Razaf) – 4:16
 "Blues for Juanita" (Jackson) – 3:55
 "There Will Never Be Another You" (Mack Gordon, Harry Warren) – 4:40
 "Easy Living" (Ralph Rainger, Leo Robin) – 4:10
 "Django" (John Lewis) – 7:43
 "Darn That Dream" (Eddie DeLange, Jimmy Van Heusen) – 5:16
 "Billie's Bounce" (Charlie Parker) – 4:45

Personnel
Milt Jackson – vibraphone
John Lewis – piano
Percy Heath – bass
Connie Kay, Mickey Roker – drums, percussion
Bobby McFerrin (tracks 1 & 13), Take 6 (track 1) – vocals
Wynton Marsalis (tracks 3 & 6), Harry "Sweets" Edison (tracks 4 & 7) – trumpet
Freddie Hubbard – flugelhorn (track 9)
Phil Woods – alto saxophone (tracks 2 & 11)
Jimmy Heath (track 8), Illinois Jacquet (track 4 & 7), Branford Marsalis (tracks 5 & 10), Nino Tempo (track 12) – tenor saxophone

References

Atlantic Records albums
Modern Jazz Quartet albums
1994 albums
Albums produced by Ahmet Ertegun
Albums produced by Arif Mardin